In representation theory of Lie groups and Lie algebras, a fundamental representation is an irreducible finite-dimensional representation of a semisimple Lie group
or Lie algebra whose highest weight is a fundamental weight. For example, the defining module of a classical Lie group is a fundamental representation. Any finite-dimensional irreducible representation of a semisimple Lie group or Lie algebra can be constructed from the fundamental representations by a procedure due to Élie Cartan. Thus in a certain sense, the fundamental representations are the elementary building blocks for arbitrary finite-dimensional representations.

Examples 
 In the case of the general linear group, all fundamental representations are exterior products of the defining module. 
 In the case of the special unitary group SU(n), the n − 1 fundamental representations are the wedge products  consisting of the alternating tensors, for k = 1, 2, ..., n − 1.
 The spin representation of the twofold cover of an odd orthogonal group, the odd spin group, and the two half-spin representations of the twofold cover of an even orthogonal group, the even spinor group, are fundamental representations that cannot be realized in the space of tensors.
 The adjoint representation of the simple Lie group of type E8 is a fundamental representation.

Explanation 

The  irreducible representations of a simply-connected  compact Lie group are indexed by their highest weights. These weights are the lattice points in an orthant Q+ in the weight lattice of the Lie group consisting of the dominant integral weights. It can be proved
that there exists a set of fundamental weights, indexed by the vertices of the Dynkin diagram, such that any dominant integral weight is a non-negative integer linear combination of the fundamental weights. The corresponding irreducible representations are the fundamental representations of the Lie group. From the expansion of a dominant weight in terms of the fundamental weights one can take a corresponding tensor product of the fundamental representations and extract one copy of the irreducible representation corresponding to that dominant weight.

Other uses 

Outside of Lie theory, the term fundamental representation is sometimes loosely used to refer to a smallest-dimensional faithful representation, though this is also often called the standard or defining representation (a term referring more to the history, rather than having a well-defined mathematical meaning).

References 

 .

Specific

Lie groups
Representation theory